Cameron Alexander Dallas (born September 8, 1994) is an American Internet personality, actor and singer best known for his prominence on the video applications Vine and YouTube. Dallas starred in two films in 2014 and 2015; Expelled and The Outfield. In 2016 Cameron starred on his Netflix reality show Chasing Cameron which followed him on his singing tour of Europe. In 2020 he took over the role of Aaron Samuels in the Mean Girls musical on Broadway in January and then on the 8th of September he released Dear Scarlett, his first album.

Career
Dallas began his career in September 2012 posting Vines of himself playing jokes and pranks on his friends and family. In 2014, Dallas had 8.1 million followers on Vine, making him the 11th most followed account, and 11.3 million followers on Twitter. As of 2017, Dallas had over 20 million followers on Instagram, which at the time placed him as the second most popular Instagram account and made him approximately $17,000 per a sponsored post.

In April 2014, AwesomenessTV CEO Brian Robbins announced he was making a film starring Dallas. The film, titled Expelled, was the story of a prankster expelled from school, and was released later that year, on December 12, 2014.
In May 2015, Dallas starred in two episodes of the NBC thriller television series American Odyssey. That same year, Dallas appeared in The Outfield opposite Nash Grier, and Caroline Sunshine. The film was released on November 10, 2015, through video on demand. In November 2015, it was revealed Dallas had been cast in Neighbors 2: Sorority Rising. However, his scenes were cut.

On April 20, 2015, Dallas released his debut single "She Bad". He also was later featured in Daniel Skye's track "All I Want Is You". In June 2016, Dallas announced that he would be starring in an upcoming Netflix reality series Chasing Cameron. It premiered on December 27, 2016. By July 2017, he had reached 20 million followers on Instagram and 11 million on Twitter.

Dallas won Teen Choice Awards in 2014, 2015 and 2016, and a People’s Choice Award in 2017.

In 2020, Dallas made his Broadway debut as Aaron Samuels in Mean Girls, while the originator of the role, Kyle Selig, took a leave of absence. That year, Dallas also released his first album, Dear Scarlett, on September 8.

Personal life
He has described his ethnic background as half Scottish, a quarter Mexican and a quarter German.

On December 31, 2018, New Year's Eve, Dallas was arrested and charged with assault for allegedly punching a man in the face at the Hyatt Residence Club Grand Aspen in Aspen, Colorado. He had previously been arrested on felony vandalism charges in 2015.

On August 23, 2019, Dallas announced on social media that for the past 2.5 years he had been struggling with addiction, depression, and family trauma. On October 15, 2019, he ran in a charity that helped raise money for those struggling with addiction and to help them get access to treatment.

Filmography

Film

Television

Theatre

Discography

Studio albums

Singles

As lead artist

As featured artist

Awards and nominations

Notes

References

External links

1994 births
American people of Scottish descent
American male actors of Mexican descent
American people of German descent
Fullscreen (company) people
Living people
People from Chino Hills, California
Streamy Award winners
Vine (service) celebrities
American YouTubers
American TikTokers
21st-century American male actors
Participants in American reality television series